Arthrorhabdus, from the Greek ἄρθρον, a joint, and ῥάβδος, a staff, is a genus of Scolopendrid centipede in the subfamily Scolopendrinae. Species are found in Mexico and the Southern United States (A. pygmaeus), Australia (A. paucispinus & A. mjöbergi), and South Africa (A. formosus). Since a reapprasial in the genus in 2010, the genus only has four species. It may be polyphyletic.

Taxonomic history 
1891: Genus described by Reginald Innes Pocock, with one species (A. formosus). Notes on the Syonymy of some Species of Scolopendridæ, with Descriptions of new Genera and Species of the Group

2004: A. spinifer moved to genus Rhoda by Rowland M. Shelley and Amazonas Chagas Junior. THE CENTIPEDE GENUS ARTHRORHABDUS POCOCK, 1891, IN THE WESTERN HEMISPHERE: POTENTIAL OCCURRENCE OF A. PYGMAEUS (POCOCK, 1895) IN BELIZE

2010: Reappraisal by John G. E. Lewis removes A. jonesii and A. somalus from the genus, renaming the latter Scolopendra somala. A key and annotated list of the Scolopendra species of the Old World with a reappraisal of Arthrorhabdus

Identification and morphology 
Arthrorhabdus species bear several morphological similarities to those of the genus Cormocephalus: their spiracles, eyes, and mouthparts are the same. It also resembles members of the genera Scolopendra and Asanada, but can be differentiated from other genera by a variety of characteristics, specifically the head not overlapping the first tergite, additionally from Scolopendra by the shape of the mouthparts and spiracles, and further from Cormocephalus by morphological features on the legs.

Arthrorhabdus species have between 18 and 26 antennomeres (antennae segments).

Species 

 Arthrorhabdus formosus Pocock, 1891 - South Africa.
 Arthrorhabdus mjöbergi Kraepelin, 1916 - Australia.
 Arthrorhabdus paucispinus L.E.Koch, 1984 - Australia
 Arthrorhabdus pygmaeus Pocock, 1895 - s USA, Mexico, possibly Belize.

References 


 
Animals described in 1907
Arthropods of Mexico
Arthropods of the United States
Centipede genera